Powell is a Welsh surname. It is a patronymic form of the Welsh name Hywel (later Anglicized as Howell), with the prefix ap meaning "son of", together forming ap Hywel, or "son of Hywel". It is an uncommon name among those of Welsh ancestry. It originates in a dynasty of kings in Wales, and Brittany in the 9th and 10th century, and three Welsh royal houses of that time onwards. The House of Tudor, one of the Royal houses of England, also descended from them.

Deceased
Adam Clayton Powell, Sr. (1865–1953), minister of the Abyssinian Baptist Church in Harlem, New York
Adam Clayton Powell, Jr. (1908–1972), minister and politician, first African American to become a powerful figure in the United States Congress
Alfred Hoare Powell (1865–1960) English Arts and Crafts architect, pottery decorator and artist
Anthony Powell (1905–2000), English novelist
Art Powell (wide receiver) (1937–2015), American football player, brother of Charlie Powell
Arthur William Baden Powell (1901–1987), New Zealand malacologist and paleontologist
Baden Powell (mathematician) (1796–1860), English mathematician; father of Robert Baden-Powell
Bill Powell (1916–2009), American golf course designer
Billy Powell (1952–2009), keyboardist of the American band Lynyrd Skynyrd
Brian Powell (baseball player) (1973–2009), American baseball player
Bud Powell (1924–1966), American jazz pianist and composer
Caroline Amelia Powell (1852–1935), Irish-born American engraver and illustrator
Cecil Frank Powell (1903–1969), British physicist and Nobel laureate in physics
Charles Powell (disambiguation), several people
Charlie Powell (1932–2014), American football player, brother of Art Powell
Colin Powell (1937–2021), United States Secretary of State, Chairman of the Joint Chiefs of Staff
Cozy Powell (1947–1998), English drummer for the bands Black Sabbath, Rainbow, and Whitesnake
Cynthia Lennon née Powell (1939–2015), British first wife of John Lennon
Dawn Powell (1896–1965), American writer of satirical novels and stories
Dick Powell (1904–1963), American singer, actor, producer, and director
Dilys Powell (1901–1995), British journalist, author, and film critic
E. Alexander Powell (1879–1957), American war correspondent and author
Eileen Louisa Powell (1913–1997), Australian trade unionist and women's activist
Eleanor Powell (1912–1982), American actress and dancer
Elkan Harrison Powell (1888–1966), American publisher
Enoch Powell (1912–1998), British politician
Ernest Powell  (1861–1928), English cricketer
Felix Powell (1878–1942), Welsh songwriter
Francis Powell (priest) (1909–1998), dean of Belize
Sir Francis Powell, 1st Baronet (1827–1911), English politician
Frank Powell (1877–?), Canadian stage and silent film actor, screenwriter, and director
Frank Powell (footballer), English football manager
Frank John Powell (1891–1971), British Liberal Party politician and magistrate
Foster Powell (1734–1793) English long-distance walker
Frederick Powell (1895–1992), British Royal Air Force pilot
George Henry Powell (1880–1951), Welsh songwriter
Gwyneth Powell (1946–2022), English actress
Harold Powell (disambiguation), several people
Israel Wood Powell (1801–1852), Canadian politician in Ontario
Israel Wood Powell (1836–1915), Canadian politician in British Columbia
Ivor Powell (1916–2012), Welsh footballer
Jack Powell (disambiguation), multiple people
Jackie Powell (1871–1955), South African rugby player
James Powell and Sons, English glassworkers
Jane Powell (1929–2021), American actress, singer, and dancer
Jay Powell (politician) (1952–2019), American lawyer and politician
Jesse Powell (1971–2022), American R&B singer
Jody Powell (1943–2009), White House press secretary for Jimmy Carter
John Powell (disambiguation), several people
John Wesley Powell (1834–1902), American soldier, geologist, and explorer of the American West
Julie Powell (1973–2022), American food writer and memoirist
Lange Powell (1886–1938), Australian architect and Freemason, designer of the Masonic Temple in Brisbane
Leven Powell (1737–1810), American politician, soldier and planter
Levin M. Powell (1798–1885), American naval officer
Lewis Thornton Powell  (1844–1865), Confederate soldier, hanged as a conspirator in the Lincoln assassination
Lewis Franklin Powell, Jr. (1907–1998), Associate Justice of the Supreme Court of the United States
Lewis W. Powell (1882–1942), American politician and lawyer
Mel Powell (1923–1998), American jazz pianist and composer
Michael Powell (1905–1990), British film director
Michael J. D. Powell (1936–2015), British mathematician
Paul Powell (director) (1881–1944), American journalist, director, producer, screenwriter and actor
Philip Powell (architect) (1921–2003), British architect
Paul Warner Powell (1978–2010), American murderer convicted for the murder of Stacie Reed
Ray Edwin Powell (1887–1973), Canadian businessman (founder of Alcan Aluminium) and educator (Chancellor of McGill University)
Robert Baden-Powell, 1st Baron Baden-Powell (1857–1941), British Army lieutenant-general; founder of the world Scouting Movement
Robert E. Powell (1923–1997), mayor of Monroe, Louisiana, 1979 to 1996
Roger Powell (1896–1990), English bookbinder
Ron Powell (1929–1992), Welsh goalkeeper who played for Chesterfield
Sam Powell (footballer) (1899–1961), English footballer
Sandy Powell (comedian) (1900–1982), English comedian best known for his radio work of the 1930s 
Seth Powell (1862–1945), Wales international footballer
T. G. E. Powell (1916–1975), British archaeologist
Thomas Powell (botanist) (1809–1897), British missionary to Samoa and botanist
Vince Powell (1928–2009), British sitcom writer
Wick Powell (1905–1973), Welsh international rugby union footballer
Wickham Powell (1892–1961), Welsh international rugby union and rugby league footballer
William Powell (1892–1984), American actor
William G. Powell (1871–1955), Marine Corps Brevet Medal recipient

Living
Adam Powell (game designer) (born 1976), British co-founder of Neopets
Adam Clayton Powell IV (born 1962), American politician
Andrew Powell (born 1949), English music composer and performer
Andy Powell (born 1950), English guitarist for rock band Wishbone Ash
Andy Powell (born 1981), Welsh rugby union internationalist 
Annie Powell (born 1976), Designer, Home renovator, Mother of Theo Powell
Asafa Powell (born 1982), Jamaican athlete
Boog Powell (born 1941), popular nickname of John Wesley Powell, American baseball player (1961–77 in Major League Baseball)
Boog Powell (outfielder) (born 1993), nickname of Herschel Mack Powell IV, American baseball player (not related to the above)
Brian Powell (sociologist) (born 1954), American sociologist
Caroline Powell (disambiguation), several people
Catherine Powell (born 1967), British businesswoman
Ceri Powell (born 1963), Welsh geologist and Royal Dutch Shell executive
Charles Powell (born 1941), British diplomat and businessman, advisor to Margaret Thatcher and John Major
Charles Powell (historian) (born 1960), British historian of Spain
Cornell Powell (born 1997), American football player
Dante Powell (comedian), American stand-up comedian
Daren Powell (born 1978), West Indian cricketer
Dennis Powell (born 1963), American baseball pitcher 
Dina Powell (born 1974), American politician
Don Powell (born 1946), drummer for English rock band Slade
Duke Powell, American paramedic and politician
Emma Powell, South African politician
Eric Powell (comics) (born 1975), American comic book artist and writer
Frank Neff Powell (born 1947), Episcopal Bishop of Southwestern Virginia
Gary Powell (disambiguation), several people
Glen Powell, American actor
Hope Powell (born 1966), English female footballer and manager
James Powell (author) (born 1932), Canadian mystery writer
Jay Powell (born 1972), American baseball pitcher
Jenny Powell (born 1968), English television presenter
Jim Powell (British novelist) (born 1949), British novelist
Jim Powell (poet), American poet and translator 
Jim Powell (sportscaster), American sportscaster
Jerome Powell (born 1953), American attorney and investment banker, current Federal Reserve Chair
Joe Powell (American football) (born 1994), American football player
John Powell (disambiguation), several people
Keith Powell (born c. 1979/1980), American TV actor
Kieran Powell (born 1990), Nevisian cricketer
Lamar Powell (born 1993), English footballer
Laurene Powell Jobs née Powell (born 1963), American businesswoman
Lin Powell (born 1939), Australian politician
Magnus Powell (born 1974), Swedish footballer
Marshawn Powell (born 1990), American basketball player
Mark Allan Powell, American biblical scholar
Matt Powell (born 1978), Welsh rugby union footballer
Mike Powell (athlete), American world record holder in the long jump
Myles Powell (born 1997), American basketball player
Nick Powell (born 1994), English footballer
Nigel Powell (born 1971), English musician
Norman Powell (born 1993), American basketball player
Owen Powell (born 1988), American musician, Police Officer
Peter Powell (DJ) (born 1951), British disc jockey on BBC Radio 1 in the 1970s and 1980s
Renee Powell (born 1946), American professional golfer
Ricardo Powell (born 1978), Jamaican cricketer
Robert Powell (composer) (born 1932), American composer
Robert Powell (born 1944), British actor
Roger Powell (disambiguation), several people
Ronald Powell (born 1991), American football player                       
Rovman Powell (born 1993), Jamaica and West Indies cricket player
Sandy Powell (costume designer) (born 1960), British costume designer who has been nominated nine times for the Academy 
Sara Jordan Powell (born 1938), American gospel musician
Shawn Powell (American football) (born 1988), American football player
Sidney Katherine Powell (born 1955), American attorney and federal prosecutor
Sylvester Earl Powell (born 1972), American songwriter and music producer
Theo powell (born 2004) singer, song and performer
Tristram Powell (born 1940), English television director, film director, writer and producer
Walter W. Powell (born 1951), American sociologist
Wendy Powell (born 1971), American voice actor
William Powell (Liberal Democrat politician) (born 1950), Welsh politician

Fictional characters
 Colleen Powell, in the Australian TV series Prisoner
 Milo Powell, the title character in the Canadian-Filipino animated series Captain Flamingo
Herbert 'Herb' Powell, Homer Simpson's half brother on The Simpsons
 Powell, various family members on No Ordinary Family television series
 Sergeant Al Powell, in the 1988 film Die Hard

See also

 Powell baronets, several baronetcies
 Powell (given name)
 Baden Powell (surname)
 Powell (disambiguation)
 Powells (disambiguation)
 
Powel
Powdrell
Howell (surname)
Welsh surnames

English-language surnames
Anglicised Welsh-language surnames
Surnames of Welsh origin
Patronymic surnames
Surnames from given names